Karur Vysya Bank is a Scheduled Commercial Bank, headquartered in Karur in Tamil Nadu, India. It was founded in 1916 by M. A. Venkatarama Chettiar and Athi Krishna Chettiar. The bank primarily operates in the treasury, corporate/wholesale banking, and retail banking segments.

KVB provides services such as personal, corporate, and agricultural banking and services to NRIs and SMBs. The bank had approximately 800 branches and 1,650 ATMs as of 31 March 2020. KVB has recorded a Total 

History 

The Karur Vysya Bank Limited, popularly known as KVB, was set up on 25 July 1916 by M. A. Venkatarama Chettiar and Athi Krishna Chettiar to capitalise on the previously unexploited market of traders and agriculturists in and around Karur, a town in Tamil Nadu. The bank later expanded out of Karur in search of additional business opportunities and established a presence across India.

The bank celebrated its centenary on 10 September 2016 at Chennai with the then-President of India Shri. Pranab Mukherjee as the guest of honor.

See also

 Banking in India
 List of banks in India
 Reserve Bank of India
 Indian Financial System Code
 List of largest banks
 List of companies of India
 Make in India

References

External links

 The official site of The Karur Vysya Bank Limited

Private sector banks in India
Banks established in 1916
Companies based in Karur
Companies based in Tamil Nadu
Indian companies established in 1916
Companies listed on the National Stock Exchange of India
Companies listed on the Bombay Stock Exchange